Edgardo Goás  (born ) is a Puerto Rican male volleyball player. He has been part of the Puerto Rico men's national volleyball team since 2007 being one of the most decorated setters in the history of Puerto Rico volleyball. Winning championship in more than five countries as well as being the only Puerto Rican setter to have played Plusliga in Poland where he signed for Polish team Chemik Bydgoszcz.

Graduated from Penn State University in 2012, majoring in Business Communication. Some of his college accolades: Four time final four participant, Three time AVCA All-American, Four Time EIVA First Team, Three time team captain and NCAA Champion in 2007 among others.

Clubs
 Capitanes de Arecibo (2012)
 Kokkola Tiikerit (2013)
 Stroitel Minsk (2013-2014)
 Capitanes de Arecibo (2014)
 Konya Belediye (2015)
 Capitanes de Arecibo (2015-2016)
 Indios de Mayaguez (2016-2017)
 Konya Belediye (2017)
 Luczniczka Bydgoszcz (2017-2018)
 Mets de Guaynabo (2018-2020)

References

1989 births
Living people
Penn State Nittany Lions men's volleyball players
Puerto Rican men's volleyball players
Place of birth missing (living people)